Mary King (fl. 1629), was a Scottish burgess.

She was born in Edinburgh towards the end of the 16th century. Mary earned enough money to afford a decent lifestyle by sewing garments and selling fine cloths from a shop on the High Street called a laich forebooth, or a low stall. Mary was also a burgess in her day, which meant she had voting rights in the city, which was very uncommon in those days.

In 1616 she married a local merchant burgess, Thomas Nemo or Nimmo, and together they had four children – Alexander, Euphame, Jonet and William. Thomas died in 1629, leaving Mary and her four children alone. Together they moved to what was then known as King's or Alexander King's Close. Alexander King had been a prominent lawyer in the city and was no actual relation to Mary. The name of the close was later changed to her name, Mary King.

Mary King's Close

Mary King’s Close consists of a number of closes which were originally narrow streets with tenement houses on either side, stretching up to seven storeys high and located in the heart of the city of Edinburgh’s Old Town (affectionately nicknamed at the time as Auld Reekie) in Scotland.

Due to over-crowding, the city reopened the closes some 40 years later. In 1753 the burgh council decided to erect a new building on this site, the Royal Exchange (now the City Chambers). The houses at the top of the closes were knocked down and part of the lower sections were kept and used as the foundations for the Royal Exchange. The remnants of the closes were left beneath the building.

External links
 Mary King's Close official website

17th-century Scottish businesspeople
Year of birth missing 
Year of death missing
Businesspeople from Edinburgh
Scottish women in business
17th-century merchants
17th-century businesswomen